The following is a list of books and other publications based on the universe of the Pokémon franchise.

Official Pokémon video game strategy guidebooks 

 Pokémon Red and Blue: Prima's Official Strategy Guide
 Pokémon Yellow: Prima's Official Strategy Guide
 Pokémon Gold & Silver: Prima's Official Strategy Guide
 Pokémon Crystal: Prima's Official Strategy Guide
 Pokémon Gold Silver Crystal: Prima's Official Strategy Guide
 Pokémon Ruby and Sapphire: Prima's Official Strategy Guide
 Pokémon FireRed and LeafGreen: Prima's Official Strategy Guide
 Pokémon Emerald: Prima's Official Strategy Guide
 Pokémon 10th Anniversary Collector's Edition Complete Pokédex
 Pokémon Diamond and Pearl: Prima's Official Strategy Guide
 Pokémon Diamond and Pearl Pokédex
 Pokémon Platinum: Prima's Official Strategy Guide
 Pokémon HeartGold and SoulSilver: Prima's Official Strategy Guide
 Pokémon HeartGold and SoulSilver Pokédex
 Pokémon Black and White: Prima's Official Strategy Guide
 Pokémon Black and White Pokédex
 Pokémon Black & Pokémon White Versions: Official National Pokédex
 Pokémon Black 2 and White 2: Prima's Official Strategy Guide
 Pokémon Black Version 2 & Pokémon White Version 2: The Official National Pokédex
 Pokémon X & Pokémon Y: The Official Kalos Region Guidebook
 Pokémon X & Pokémon Y: The Official Kalos Region Pokédex & Postgame Adventure Guide
 Pokémon Omega Ruby & Pokémon Alpha Sapphire: The Official Hoenn Region Strategy Guide
 Pokémon Omega Ruby & Pokémon Alpha Sapphire: The Official National Pokédex
 Pokémon Sun & Pokémon Moon: The Official Strategy Guide
 Pokémon Sun & Pokémon Moon: The Official Alola Region Pokédex & Postgame Adventure Guide
 Pokémon Ultra Sun & Pokémon Ultra Moon: The Official Alola Region Strategy Guide
 Pokémon Ultra Sun & Pokémon Ultra Moon Edition: The Official National Pokédex
 Pokémon: Let's Go, Pikachu! & Pokémon: Let's Go, Eevee!: Official Trainer's Guide & Pokédex
 Pokémon Sword & Pokémon Shield: The Official Galar Region Strategy Guide
 Pokémon Sword & Pokémon Shield: The Official Galar Region Pokédex
Pokemon Master Pokédex: Prima's Official Strategy Guide

Pokémon anime novelization series

The series of Pokémon anime novelizations, published in North America by Scholastic, comprises 28 books. The books are adapted by Tracey West, Jennifer L. Johnson, and Sheila Sweeny. While 26 books are based on actual anime episodes, Race to Danger and Talent Showdown are original stories featuring the Pokémon anime characters.

 I Choose You!
 Island of the Giant Pokémon
 Attack of the Prehistoric Pokémon
 Night in the Haunted Tower
 Team Rocket Blasts Off!
 Pokémon Charizard, Go!
 Splashdown in Cerulean City
 Return of the Squirtle Squad
 Journey to the Orange Islands
 Secret of the Pink Pokemon
 The Four-Star Challenge
 Scyther, Heart Of A Champion
 Race To Danger
 Talent Showdown
 Psyduck Ducks Out
 Thundershock in Pummelo Stadium
 Go West, Young Ash
 Ash Ketchum, Pokémon Detective
 Prepare For Trouble
 Battle for the Zephyr Badge
 The Chikorita Challenge
 All Fired Up
 Ash to the Rescue
 Secrets of the GS Ball
 Prize Pokemon
 Teaming Up With Totodile
 Tough Enough
 Winner Takes All

 Pokémon: Battle Frontier series
 Deoxys In Danger
 Celebi Rescue
 Grovyle Trouble
 Team Rocket's Truce

 Pokémon Reader series includes
 Pikachu In Love
 Get Well, Pikachu!
 Snack Attack!
 Catch That Wobbuffet!
 The Haunted Gym
 Let it Snow!
 Pokemon In Disguise!
 Togepi Springs Into Action!
 Time Out For Torchic
 Save the Shieldon
 Ash's Triple Threat
 Battle for the Bolt Badge
 Wrath of the Legends

Pokémon Junior
Pokémon Junior is a series of 15 Pokémon novels for younger readers, all adapted from the Pokémon anime series except for Save Our Squirtle! and Bulbasaur's Bad Day. The books are adapted by Tracey West, Gregg Sacon and S. E. Heller.

 Pokémon Junior book series titles include
 Surf's Up, Pikachu!
 Meowth, The Big Mouth
 Save Our Squirtle Bulbasaur's Bad Day
 Two of a Kind
 Raichu Shows Off
 Nidoran's New Friend
 A Pokémon Snow-Down
 Snorlax Takes A Stand
 Good-Bye, Lapras
 Bellossom's Big Battle
 The Snubbull Blues
 Hoothoot's Haunted Forest
 Pichu's Apple Company
 The Wobbuffet Village

Novelizations of Pokémon films 
 Pokemon The First Movie: Mewtwo Strikes Back
 Pokémon the Movie 2000: The Power of One
 Pokémon the Movie 3 - Spell of the Unown
 Mewtwo Returns Pokémon 4Ever Destiny Deoxys Lucario and the Mystery of Mew Pokémon Ranger and the Temple of the Sea The Rise of Darkrai Novelizations of Pokémon short films 
The first three theatrical short films were dubbed by 4Kids Entertainment and distributed by Nintendo and Kids' WB!. Novelizations of the short films include:

 Pikachu's Vacation Adapted from Pikachu's Summer Vacation (Pokémon: The First Movie: 1999)
 Pikachu's Rescue Adventure (Pokémon: The Movie 2000: 2000)
 Pikachu and Pichu Adapted from: Pikachu and Pichu in the City (Pokémon 3: The Movie: 2001)
 Pikachu's Peekaboo (Pokémon 4Ever: 2002)
 Camp Pikachu (Pokémon Heroes: 2003)
 Gotta Dance! (Pokémon: Jirachi Wish Maker: 2004)
 Pikachu's Summer Festival (Pokémon: Destiny Deoxys: 2005)
 Pikachu's Ghost Festival (Lucario and the Mystery of Mew: 2006)
 Pikachu's Island Adventure (Pokémon Ranger and the Temple of the Sea: 2007)

Pokémon Tales
 is a series of picture books originally published in Japan by Shogakukan. In North America VIZ Media published the books in English.

Books published in English include:
  (Story: Akihito Toda, Art: Kagemaru Himeno)
  (Story: Tomoaki Imakuni, Art: Naoyo Kimura)
  (Story: Akihito Toda, Art: Benimaru Itoh)
  (Story and art: Toshinao Aoki)
  (Story: Hajime Yume, Art: Kagemaru Himeno)
  (Also titled "Clefairy's Sing-Along" - Story: Kunimi Kawamura, Art: Kagemaru Himeno)
  (Also titled "Fly, Fly Butterfree" - Story: Toshiko Takashi, Art: Naoyo Kimura)
  (Story: Junko Wada, Art: Naoyo Kimura)
 Meet Mew (Story: Akihito Toda, Art: Kagemaru Himeno)
 Snorlax's Snack (Story and art: Sumiyoshi Kizuki)
 Jigglypuff's Magic Lullaby (Story: Megumi Hayashibara, Art: Kagemaru Himeno) 
 Lapras Makes A Friend Eevee's Weather Report Diglett's Birthday Party First Prize For Starmie Seel To The Rescue Mewtwo's Watching You! Magnemite's Mission Don't Laugh, Charizard! Gengar's Shadow Togepi's Tears A Star For Tauros Movie Special: I'm Not Pikachu (Story: Junko Wada, Art: Toshinao Aoki)
 Movie Special Volume 2: Pikachu's Unparalleled AdventureBoth Shogakukan and Viz published Pokémon Gold and Silver Tales storybooks. Books published in English include:
 Detective Chikorita Cyndaquil And The Mysterious Hole Totodile's One Gulp Muddy Pichu Wobbuffet Watches Clouds Swinub's Nose Wake Up, Lugia! Look Out, Houndour! Corsola's Brave New World''

References

External links 

 Pokémon Tales (Archived) at Shogakukan 
 Pokémon Daisuki Picture Books at Media Factory 

Japanese picture books
Books
Series of children's books
Viz Media children's picture books